Roger Machado Marques (born 25 April 1975), also known simply as Roger, is a Brazilian football manager and former player who played as a left back. 
Machado's playing career was mainly associated with Grêmio, a club he represented for ten years. After retiring with Fluminense in 2008, he later became a manager, being notably in charge of both his former sides.

Playing career
A Grêmio youth graduate, Porto Alegre-born Machado made his debut for the club in 1994. A regular starter, he was among of the club's most successful era, achieving one Série A and one Copa Libertadores.

In 2004 Machado moved abroad, signing for J1 League side Vissel Kobe. Returning to Brazil in 2006, he joined Fluminense and also featured regularly. In 2009, he agreed to a move to D.C. United, but the deal was cancelled after a back injury, and he subsequently retired.

Machado's maiden appearance for the Brazil football team occurred on 12 June 2001, in a 1–0 loss against Mexico for the year's Copa América.

Managerial career
Machado returned to his first club Grêmio on 5 January 2011, as an assistant manager. He left the club in December 2013, and was subsequently appointed manager of Juventude the following 19 February.

Sacked on 28 July 2014, Roger was named Novo Hamburgo manager on 19 December. On 26 May 2015, he replaced Luiz Felipe Scolari at the helm of former side Grêmio.

Machado led the club to an impressive third position during the campaign, being praised for his tactical duties. On 15 September 2016, after a poor run of form, he resigned.

On 2 December 2016, Machado was announced at Atlético Mineiro, signing a two-year deal. He was relieved from his duties on 20 July of the following year, after a 2–0 home loss against Bahia.

On 22 November 2017, Machado was appointed manager of Palmeiras for the 2018 season. He was dismissed the following 26 July, being subsequently replaced by Luiz Felipe Scolari; his team went on to win the first division after his dismissal.

On 2 April 2019, Machado replaced sacked Enderson Moreira at the helm of Bahia. On 2 September of the following year, after a 5–3 home loss against Flamengo, he was himself dismissed.

On 27 February 2021, Machado was named manager of another club he represented as a player, Fluminense. He was sacked on 21 August, after being knocked out of the 2021 Copa Libertadores.

On 14 February 2022, Machado replaced Vagner Mancini at the helm of Grêmio, but was himself dismissed on 1 September.

Career statistics

Club

International

Managerial statistics

Honours

Player
Grêmio
Copa Libertadores: 1995
Campeonato Brasileiro Série A: 1996
Copa do Brasil: 1994, 1997, 2001
Campeonato Gaúcho: 1995, 1996, 1999, 2001

Fluminense
Copa do Brasil: 2007

Manager
Atlético Mineiro
Campeonato Mineiro: 2017

Bahia          
Campeonato Baiano: 2019, 2020

Grêmio
Campeonato Gaúcho: 2022
Recopa Gaúcha: 2022

Individual
Campeonato Paulista Best manager: 2018

References

External links

1975 births
Living people
Footballers from Porto Alegre
Brazilian footballers
Association football defenders
Campeonato Brasileiro Série A players
Grêmio Foot-Ball Porto Alegrense players
Fluminense FC players
J1 League players
Vissel Kobe players
2001 Copa América players
Brazil international footballers
Brazilian expatriate footballers
Brazilian expatriate sportspeople in Japan
Expatriate footballers in Japan
Brazilian football managers
Campeonato Brasileiro Série A managers
Campeonato Brasileiro Série C managers
Esporte Clube Juventude managers
Esporte Clube Novo Hamburgo managers
Grêmio Foot-Ball Porto Alegrense managers
Clube Atlético Mineiro managers
Sociedade Esportiva Palmeiras managers
Esporte Clube Bahia managers
Fluminense FC managers